The following is an index of Somaliland-related articles.


A

Adal Sultanate
Ajuran Sultanate
Awdal

B

Bank of Somaliland
Berbera
Borama alphabet
British Somaliland
Burao

C

Cinema of Somaliland
Coat of arms of Somaliland
Communications in Somaliland

D

Dahabshiil
Darod
Dervish State
Dhusamareb

E

East African shilling
Economy of Somaliland
Elections in Somaliland
Erigavo

F

Fafahdhun
Football in Somaliland
Foreign relations of Somaliland

G

Geledi Sultanate
Geography of Somalia

H

Hargeisa
Hawiye
Heis (town)
Hiran
History of Somaliland
Human rights in Somaliland

I

Injera
Isaaq

J

K

L

Las Anod
Las Khorey
LGBT rights in Somaliland
List of Somalis

M

Majeerteen Sultanate
Media of Somaliland
Mission of Somaliland, London
Mudug

N

O

Ogaden

P

Politics of Somaliland
Port of Berbera
Port of Las Khorey
President of Somaliland
Prime Minister of Somaliland

R

Rahanweyn
Regions of Somaliland
Religion in Somaliland
Refugees of Somalia

S

Salweyn
Sanaag
Somali art
Somaliland
Somaliland and the Commonwealth of Nations
Somaliland shilling
Sool

T

Togdheer
Tourism in Somaliland
Transport in Somaliland

U

University of Hargeisa
University of Somaliland

W

Woqooyi Galbeed

X

Xeer

See also

Lists of country-related topics - similar lists for other countries

 
Somaliland
Somaliland